Ya is a consonant of Indic abugidas. In modern Indic scripts, Ya is derived from the early "Ashoka" Brahmi letter  after having gone through the Gupta letter .

Āryabhaṭa numeration

Aryabhata used Devanagari letters for numbers, very similar to the Greek numerals, even after the invention of Indian numerals. The values of the different forms of य are: 
य  = 30 (३०)
यि  = 3,000 (३ ०००)
यु  = 300,000 (३ ०० ०००)
यृ  = 30,000,000 (३ ०० ०० ०००)
यॢ  = 3 (३×१०९)
ये  = 3 (३×१०११)
यै  = 3 (३×१०१३)
यो  = 3 (३×१०१५)
यौ  = 3 (३×१०१७)

Historic Ya
There are three different general early historic scripts - Brahmi and its variants, Kharoṣṭhī, and Tocharian, the so-called slanting Brahmi. Ya as found in standard Brahmi,  was a simple geometric shape, with variations toward more flowing forms by the Gupta . The Tocharian Ya  did not have an alternate Fremdzeichen form. The third form of ya, in Kharoshthi was probably derived from Aramaic separately from the Brahmi letter.

Brahmi Ya
The Brahmi letter , Ya, is probably derived from the Aramaic Yodh , and is thus related to the modern Latin I and J and Greek Iota. Several identifiable styles of writing the Brahmi Ya can be found, most associated with a specific set of inscriptions from an artifact or diverse records from an historic period. As the earliest and most geometric style of Brahmi, the letters found on the Edicts of Ashoka and other records from around that time are normally the reference form for Brahmi letters, with vowel marks not attested until later forms of Brahmi back-formed to match the geometric writing style.

Tocharian Ya
The Tocharian letter  is derived from the Brahmi , but does not have an alternate Fremdzeichen form.

Kharoṣṭhī Ya
The Kharoṣṭhī letter  is generally accepted as being derived from the Aramaic Yodh , and is thus related to I, J and Iota, in addition to the Brahmi Ya.

Devanagari Ya

Ya (य) is a consonant of the Devanagari abugida. It ultimately arose from the Brahmi letter , after having gone through the Gupta letter . Letters that derive from it are the Gujarati letter ય, and the Modi letter 𑘧.

Devanagari-using Languages
Like all Indic scripts, Devanagari uses vowel marks attached to the base consonant to override the inherent /ə/ vowel:

Conjuncts with य

Devanagari exhibits conjunct ligatures, as is common in Indic scripts. In modern Devanagari texts, most conjuncts are formed by reducing the letter shape to fit tightly to the following letter, usually by dropping a character's vertical stem, sometimes referred to as a "half form". Some conjunct clusters are always represented by a true ligature, instead of a shape that can be broken into constituent independent letters. Vertically stacked conjuncts are ubiquitous in older texts, while only a few are still used routinely in modern Devanagari texts. The use of ligatures and vertical conjuncts may vary across languages using the Devanagari script, with Marathi in particular preferring the use of half forms where texts in other languages would show ligatures and vertical stacks.

Ligature conjuncts of य
True ligatures are quite rare in Indic scripts. The most common ligated conjuncts in Devanagari are in the form of a slight mutation to fit in context or as a consistent variant form appended to the adjacent characters. Those variants include Na and the Repha and Rakar forms of Ra. Nepali and Marathi texts use the "eyelash" Ra half form  for an initial "R" instead of repha.
 Repha र্ (r) + य (ya) gives the ligature rya: 

 Eyelash र্ (r) + य (ya) gives the ligature rya:

 य্ (y) + न (na) gives the ligature yna:

 य্ (y) + rakar र (ra) gives the ligature yra:

 छ্ (ch) + य (ya) gives the ligature chya:

 ढ্ (ḍʱ) + य (ya) gives the ligature ḍʱya:

 ड্ (ḍ) + य (ya) gives the ligature ḍya:

 द্ (d) + द্ (d) + य (ya) gives the ligature ddya:

 द্ (d) + व্ (v) + य (ya) gives the ligature dvya:

 द্ (d) + य (ya) gives the ligature dya:

 ङ্ (ŋ) + य (ya) gives the ligature ŋya:

 ष্ (ṣ) + ठ্ (ṭh) + य (ya) gives the ligature ṣṭhya:

 ठ্ (ṭh) + य (ya) gives the ligature ṭhya:

Stacked conjuncts of य
Vertically stacked ligatures are the most common conjunct forms found in Devanagari text. Although the constituent characters may need to be stretched and moved slightly in order to stack neatly, stacked conjuncts can be broken down into recognizable base letters, or a letter and an otherwise standard ligature.
 ग্ (g) + न্ (n) + य (ya) gives the ligature gnya:

 ग্ (g) + र্ (r) + य (ya) gives the ligature grya:

 ह্ (h) + य (ya) gives the ligature hya:

 ज্ (j) + ज্ (j) + य (ya) gives the ligature jjya:

 ङ্ (ŋ) + क্ (k) + ष্ (ṣ) + य (ya) gives the ligature ŋkṣya:

 त্ (t) + र্ (r) + य (ya) gives the ligature trya:

 ट্ (ṭ) + य (ya) gives the ligature ṭya:

 य্ (y) + च (ca) gives the ligature yca:

 य্ (y) + ड (ḍa) gives the ligature yḍa:

 य্ (y) + ज (ja) gives the ligature yja:

 य্ (y) + ज্ (j) + ञ (ña) gives the ligature yjña:

 य্ (y) + ल (la) gives the ligature yla:

 य্ (y) + ङ (ŋa) gives the ligature yŋa:

 य্ (y) + ञ (ña) gives the ligature yña:

Bangla Ya
The Bangla script য is derived from the Siddhaṃ , and is marked by a similar horizontal head line, but less geometric shape, than its Devanagari counterpart, य. Unlike most other Indic scripts and like Odia, the Bangla য is pronounced as a voiced postalveolar affricate (similar to the English "j" sound). The "y" sound is represented by the related letter য়. In addition to this, the inherent vowel of Bangla consonant letters is /ɔ/, so the bare letter য will sometimes be transliterated as "jo" instead of "ya". Adding o-kar, the "o" vowel mark, gives a reading of /dʒo/.
Like all Indic consonants, য can be modified by marks to indicate another (or no) vowel than its inherent "a".

য in Bangla-using languages
য is used as a basic consonant character in all of the major Bangla script orthographies, including Bangla and Assamese.

Conjuncts with য
Bangla য exhibits conjunct ligatures, as is common in Indic scripts, with a tendency towards stacked ligatures.

Bangla Ya-phala

The letter য has a special form when used as the last letter of a conjunct called "Ya-phala" (or "Jô-fôla"). This reduced form of য is appended to the right of the preceding letter or conjunct, with vowel signs falling outside of the ya-phala as in most conjuncts. The use of a reduced Ya-phala is similar to the Ra-phala and Va-phala forms, which attach to the bottom of a letter or conjunct. Unlike these other reduced consonant forms, ya-phala can be appended to the independent A vowel character. In representing Bangla text on computer systems, the Zero-width joiner is used to suppress formation of ya-phala in certain contexts, as Hasant + Ya is realized as ya-phala by default.
 ভ্ (bh) + য (ya) gives the ligature bhya:

 ব্ (b) + য (ya) gives the ligature bya:

 চ্ (c) + য (ya) gives the ligature cya:

 ঢ্ (ḍʱ) + য (ya) gives the ligature ḍʱya:

 ড্ (ḍ) + য (ya) gives the ligature ḍya:

 ধ্ (dʱ) + য (ya) gives the ligature dʱya:

 দ্ (d) + র্ (r) + য (ya) gives the ligature drya, with ra phala in addition to ya phala:

 দ্ (d) + য (ya) gives the ligature dya:

 গ্ (g) + ধ্ (dʱ) + য (ya) gives the ligature gdʱya:

 ঘ্ (ɡʱ) + য (ya) gives the ligature ɡʱya:

 গ্ (g) + ন্ (n) + য (ya) gives the ligature gnya:

 গ্ (g) + র্ (r) + য (ya) gives the ligature grya, with ra phala in addition to ya phala:

 গ্ (g) + য (ya) gives the ligature gya:

 জ্ (j) + য (ya) gives the ligature jya:

 খ্ (kh) + য (ya) gives the ligature khya:

 ক্ (k) + শ্ (ʃ) + ম্ (m) + য (ya) gives the ligature kʃmya:

 ক্ (k) + ষ্ (ṣ) + য (ya) gives the ligature kṣya:

 ক্ (k) + য (ya) gives the ligature kya:

 ল্ (l) + ক্ (k) + য (ya) gives the ligature lkya:

 ল্ (l) + য (ya) gives the ligature lya:

 ম্ (m) + য (ya) gives the ligature mya:

 ন্ (n) + ধ্ (dʱ) + য (ya) gives the ligature ndʱya:

 ন্ (n) + দ্ (d) + য (ya) gives the ligature ndya:

 ঙ্ (ŋ) + ঘ্ (ɡʱ) + য (ya) gives the ligature ŋɡʱya:

 ঙ্ (ŋ) + গ্ (g) + য (ya) gives the ligature ŋgya:

 ঙ্ (ŋ) + ক্ (k) + য (ya) gives the ligature ŋkya:

 ণ্ (ṇ) + ড্ (ḍ) + য (ya) gives the ligature ṇḍya:

 ণ্ (ṇ) + ঠ্ (ṭh) + য (ya) gives the ligature ṇṭhya:

 ণ্ (ṇ) + য (ya) gives the ligature ṇya:

 ন্ (n) + ত্ (t) + র্ (r) + য (ya) gives the ligature ntrya, with ra phala in addition to ya phala:

 ন্ (n) + ত্ (t) + য (ya) gives the ligature ntya:

 ন্ (n) + য (ya) gives the ligature nya:

 প্ (p) + র্ (r) + য (ya) gives the ligature prya, with ra phala in addition to ya phala

 প্ (p) + য (ya) gives the ligature pya:

 র্ (r) + ব্ (b) + য (ya) gives the ligature rbya, with the repha prefix in addition to ya phala:

 র্ (r) + চ্ (c) + য (ya) gives the ligature rcya, with repha and ya phala:

 র্ (r) + ঢ্ (ḍʱ) + য (ya) gives the ligature rḍʱya, with repha and ya phala:

 র্ (r) + ঘ্ (ɡʱ) + য (ya) gives the ligature rɡʱya, with repha and ya phala:

 র্ (r) + গ্ (g) + য (ya) gives the ligature rɡya, with repha and ya phala:

 র্ (r) + হ্ (h) + য (ya) gives the ligature rhya, with repha and ya phala:

 র্ (r) + জ্ (j) + য (ya) gives the ligature rjya, with repha and ya phala:

 র্ (r) + খ্ (kh) + য (ya) gives the ligature rkhya, with repha and ya phala:

 র্ (r) + ক্ (k) + য (ya) gives the ligature rkya, with repha and ya phala:

 র্ (r) + ম্ (m) + য (ya) gives the ligature rmya, with repha and ya phala:

 র্ (r) + ণ্ (ṇ) + য (ya) gives the ligature rṇya, with repha and ya phala:

 র্ (r) + শ্ (ʃ) + য (ya) gives the ligature rʃya, with repha and ya phala:

 র্ (r) + ষ্ (ṣ) + য (ya) gives the ligature rṣya, with repha and ya phala:

 র্ (r) + থ্ (th) + য (ya) gives the ligature rthya, with repha and ya phala:

 র্ (r) + ত্ (t) + য (ya) gives the ligature rtya, with repha and ya phala:

 শ্ (ʃ) + য (ya) gives the ligature ʃya:

 ষ্ (ṣ) + ঠ্ (ṭh) + য (ya) gives the ligature ṣṭhya:

 ষ্ (ṣ) + ট্ (ṭ) + য (ya) gives the ligature ṣṭya:

 ষ্ (ṣ) + য (ya) gives the ligature ṣya:

 স্ (s) + থ্ (th) + য (ya) gives the ligature sthya:

 স্ (s) + ত্ (t) + য (ya) gives the ligature stya:

 স্ (s) + য (ya) gives the ligature sya:

 থ্ (th) + য (ya) gives the ligature thya:

 ত্ (t) + ম্ (m) + য (ya) gives the ligature tmya:

 ত্ (t) + র্ (r) + য (ya) gives the ligature trya, with the ra phala and ya phala suffixes

 ট্ (ṭ) + য (ya) gives the ligature ṭya:

 ত্ (t) + ত্ (t) + য (ya) gives the ligature ttya:

 ত্ (t) + য (ya) gives the ligature tya:

 য্ (y) + য (ya) gives the ligature yya:

Other conjuncts of য
Ya-phala is almost universal, and its suppression generally only happens in order to express a repha on য instead.
 র্ (r) + য (ya) gives the ligature rya, with the repha prefix:

Gujarati Ya

Ya (ય) is the twenty-sixth consonant of the Gujarati abugida. It is derived from the Devanagari Ya  with the top bar (shiro rekha) removed, and ultimately the Brahmi letter .

Gujarati-using Languages
The Gujarati script is used to write the Gujarati and Kutchi languages. Like all Indic scripts, Gujarati uses vowel marks attached to the base consonant to override the inherent /ə/ vowel:

Conjuncts with ય

Gujarati ય exhibits conjunct ligatures, much like its parent Devanagari Script. Most Gujarati conjuncts can only be formed by reducing the letter shape to fit tightly to the following letter, usually by dropping a character's vertical stem, sometimes referred to as a "half form". A few conjunct clusters can be represented by a true ligature, instead of a shape that can be broken into constituent independent letters, and vertically stacked conjuncts can also be found in Gujarati, although much less commonly than in Devanagari.
True ligatures are quite rare in Indic scripts. The most common ligated conjuncts in Gujarati are in the form of a slight mutation to fit in context or as a consistent variant form appended to the adjacent characters. Those variants include Na and the Repha and Rakar forms of Ra.
 ર્ (r) + ય (ya)  gives the ligature RYa:

 ય્ (y) + ર (ra)  gives the ligature YRa:

 ય્ (y) + ન (na)  gives the ligature YNa:

Javanese Ya

Telugu Ya

Ya (య) is a consonant of the Telugu abugida. It ultimately arose from the Brahmi letter . It is closely related to the Kannada letter ಯ. Most Telugu consonants contain a v-shaped headstroke that is related to the horizontal headline found in other Indic scripts, although headstrokes do not connect adjacent letters in Telugu. The headstroke is normally lost when adding vowel matras.
Telugu conjuncts are created by reducing trailing letters to a subjoined form that appears below the initial consonant of the conjunct. Many subjoined forms are created by dropping their headline, with many extending the end of the stroke of the main letter body to form an extended tail reaching up to the right of the preceding consonant. This subjoining of trailing letters to create conjuncts is in contrast to the leading half forms of Devanagari and Bangla letters. Ligature conjuncts are not a feature in Telugu, with the only non-standard construction being an alternate subjoined form of Ṣa (borrowed from Kannada) in the KṢa conjunct.

Malayalam Ya

Ya (യ) is a consonant of the Malayalam abugida. It ultimately arose from the Brahmi letter , via the Grantha letter  Ya. Like in other Indic scripts, Malayalam consonants have the inherent vowel "a", and take one of several modifying vowel signs to represent syllables with another vowel or no vowel at all.

Conjuncts of യ

As is common in Indic scripts, Malayalam joins letters together to form conjunct consonant clusters. There are several ways in which conjuncts are formed in Malayalam texts: using a post-base form of a trailing consonant placed under the initial consonant of a conjunct, a combined ligature of two or more consonants joined together, a conjoining form that appears as a combining mark on the rest of the conjunct, the use of an explicit candrakkala mark to suppress the inherent "a" vowel, or a special consonant form called a "chillu" letter, representing a bare consonant without the inherent "a" vowel. Texts written with the modern reformed Malayalam orthography, put̪iya lipi, may favor more regular conjunct forms than older texts in paḻaya lipi, due to changes undertaken in the 1970s by the Government of Kerala.
 യ് (y) +  ക (ka)  gives the ligature yka:

 യ് (y) +  ത (ta)  gives the ligature yta:

 യ് (y) +  യ (ya)  gives the ligature yya:

Canadian Aboriginal Syllabics Ye

ᔦ, ᔨ, ᔪ and ᔭ are the base characters "Ye", "Yi", "Yo" and "Ya" in the Canadian Aboriginal Syllabics. The bare consonant ᔾ (Y) is a small version of the A-series letter ᔭ, although the Western Cree letter ᕀ, derived from Pitman shorthand was the original bare consonant symbol for Y. The character ᔦ is derived from a handwritten form of the Devanagari letter य, without the headline or vertical stem, and the forms for different vowels are derived by mirroring.
Unlike most writing systems without legacy computer encodings, complex Canadian syllabic letters are represented in Unicode with pre-composed characters, rather than with base characters and diacritical marks.

Odia Jya

Jya (ଯ) is a consonant of the Odia abugida. It ultimately arose from the Brahmi letter , via the Siddhaṃ letter  Ya. Unlike the cognate letter in many other Indic scripts and similar to the Bangla letter, Odia Jya is pronounced as a voiced postalveolar affricate, same as "J" in English. Like in other Indic scripts, Odia consonants have the inherent vowel "a", and take one of several modifying vowel signs to represent syllables with another vowel or no vowel at all.

As is common in Indic scripts, Odia joins letters together to form conjunct consonant clusters. The most common conjunct formation is achieved by using a small subjoined form of trailing consonants. Most consonants' subjoined forms are identical to the full form, just reduced in size, although a few drop the curved headline or have a subjoined form not directly related to the full form of the consonant. The second type of conjunct formation is through pure ligatures, where the constituent consonants are written together in a single graphic form. ଯ generates conjuncts only by subjoining and does not form ligatures.

Odia Ya

Ya (ୟ) is the second "Y" consonant of the Odia abugida. Unlike its relative, it retains the palatal approximant pronunciation "y". It is descended from the Brahmi  and Siddhaṃ letter , the same as ଯ. Like other Odia consonants, ୟ has an inherent "a" vowel, and takes one of several modifying vowel signs to represent syllables with another vowel or no vowel at all.

Conjuncts of ୟ
As is common in Indic scripts, Odia joins letters together to form conjunct consonant clusters. The most common conjunct formation is achieved by using a small subjoined form of trailing consonants. Most consonants' subjoined forms are identical to the full form, just reduced in size, although a few drop the curved headline or have a subjoined form not directly related to the full form of the consonant. The subjoined form of is unique in appearing to the right of the preceding letters, rather than below. This postfixed form of Ya is called "Ya Phala". The second type of conjunct formation is through pure ligatures, where the constituent consonants are written together in a single graphic form. This ligature may be recognizable as being a combination of two characters or it can have a conjunct ligature unrelated to its constituent characters.
 ଧ୍ (dʱ) +  ୟ (ya)  gives the ligature dʱya:

Comparison of Ya
The various Indic scripts are generally related to each other through adaptation and borrowing, and as such the glyphs for cognate letters, including Ya, are related as well.

Character encodings of Ya
Most Indic scripts are encoded in the Unicode Standard, and as such the letter Ya in those scripts can be represented in plain text with unique codepoint. Ya from several modern-use scripts can also be found in legacy encodings, such as ISCII.

References

 Conjuncts are identified by IAST transliteration, except aspirated consonants are indicated with a superscript "h" to distinguish from an unaspirated cononant + Ha, and the use of the IPA "ŋ" and "ʃ" instead of the less dinstinctive "ṅ" and "ś".

Indic letters